Youth Conference was a large scale three-day Christian event held in numerous places around the world. The originating event, YC Alberta, is held in Red Deer, Alberta, Canada. YC is a ministry of Extreme Dream Ministries.

YC is unique from other Christians music festivals in that attendees buy tickets to attend all main speakers and concerts, not just the ones they choose.

YC Weekend is typically scheduled to take place for 3 days on may long weekend each year.

History

YC was organized by the Alberta district of the Pentecostal Assemblies of Canada (PAOC). The first YC was held in 1994, with a group of 500 students. After being held for several years at the Centrium in Red Deer, Alberta, the conference outgrew the facilities and moved to Edmonton Coliseum in 2000. In 2009, 2010, and 2011, it had a record attendance of around 18,000 people. 2014 was the 20th anniversary of YC. In remembrance of the anniversary, the mayor of the city of Edmonton (Don Iveson), proclaimed "YC Days". Thus means every year, the weekend that YC is on, it is YC days.

In 2005 YC branched out to hold an event in Ukraine, YC ended after 25 years in 2019.

Format

Each year, YC has a different "theme" that expresses what organizers wish attendees to focus on during the weekend, which starts on Friday, goes through Saturday, and ends Sunday evening.

On Friday, YC kicks off in Northlands Coliseum, usually with a light and fireworks show. Then comes a contemporary worship service, followed by a speaker. Then the evening ends with a concert.

On Saturday morning, there is another worship service, after which two speakers present. At noon, the attendees are released to eat lunch, and browse the many afternoon activities YC offers, like workshops, numerous concerts, indoor games, exhibitors, and a marketplace. Then the evening brings a concert, a worship service with another speaker, and a concert.

On Sunday morning, there is a worship service with a speaker. The afternoon brings similar afternoon events as Saturday's. YC ends differently year to year. Sometimes it ends with a worship service, and a final concert. It also can end with a worship service, and then a speaker.

The event has sold out several times, with over 18,000 people in attendance. In recent years, the event has seen an average of approximately 10,000-12,000 people.

YC Alberta

YC Ukraine

Youth Conference Ukraine, or YC Kiev as it has been called, is a branch-off of YC Alberta held in Kyiv, Ukraine. Around 5,500 people attended the first 3-day event in summer 2005. Delirious? was a featured artist there. YC Kiev was run by Extreme Dream Ministries in its inaugural year, but the project is now being undertaken by the Alliance of Ukrainian Youth Leadership team.

YC Manitoba

Youth Convention Manitoba, or YC Manitoba is an annual Christian Youth Convention held in Winnipeg, Manitoba.  In 2005 YC Fusion, the original Convention name, had Mike Love — founder and president of Extreme Dreams Ministries as their keynote speaker at the conference. As Mike later recalled, he felt that Manitoba was a new mission field ready for an awakening. When the 2005 conference came to a close, Rob Bedard, the YC Fusion Director announced his position was ending which led to the announcement of Extreme Dreams Ministries future role in the conference. Changing the name from YC Fusion to YC Manitoba, Extreme Dreams Ministries and Mike Love led the way with a well-received 2006 conference and continues to do so.

YC Newfoundland & Labrador

YC Newfoundland & Labrador is the first branch off the original YC, held every year during the Canadian Thanksgiving weekend, which is usually around the second weekend of October. It's held almost on a rotational basis in the largest centers in the province; Mount Pearl's Glacier (2000), St. John's Mile One Centre (2005 & 2007), Gander's Community Centre (2002, 2004 & 2008), and Corner Brook's Pepsi Centre (2001, 2003 & 2006).

YC Belize
YC Belize was announced on May 28, 2006 at YC Alberta by Mike Love. The event was not officially announced but it was mentioned that Extreme Dream Ministries planned on collaborating with other youth missions groups to hold a Youth Conference in Belize. The event will run February 23–25, 2007 in Belize City, Belize. Two teams consisting of youth and young adults from Bethesda Christian Fellowship and Strathcona Christian Academy will assist Extreme Dream Ministries in facilitating the event.

YC Africa
YC Africa was announced on May 5, 2007 at YC Manitoba by Mike Love and consists of a conference in Zambia and Malawi, Africa. Extreme Dream Ministries has secured a 30,000 seat soccer stadium for YC Zambia.

YC Malawi
YC Malawi was announced on October 6, 2007 at YC Newfoundland. This YC took place on August 8, 2008 at the Silver Striker Stadium in Malawi, Africa.

External links
Website for YC Alberta, YC Manitoba, YC Newfoundland and YC Belize
•Website for YC Slovakia
Extreme Dream Ministries Website

Christian conferences
Protestantism in Malawi
Protestantism in Belize
Protestantism in Canada
Protestantism in Ukraine
Christian music festivals
Festivals in Edmonton
Youth conferences
1994 establishments in Alberta